Meyers (also Yanks, Yank's Station, and Tahoe Paradise) is a small unincorporated community in El Dorado County, California, United States, along U.S. Route 50 in the northern Sierra Nevada. Established in 1851, Meyers started out as a stagecoach stop, trading post and Pony Express station. The town is now registered as California Historical Landmark #708. It serves as a popular stop on the way into and out of the Tahoe Basin for travelers on Highways 50 and 89.

History
Martin Smith was the town's founder; he opened a trading post and inn on the Placerville-Carson Road in 1851. In 1859, Ephraim "Yank" Clement and his wife Lydia purchased the station and outbuildings from George Douglas and Martin Smith, who had run the station as a hostelry and stagecoach stop. The Clements enlarged the station into a three-story, fourteen-room way station which included a large stable and hay barn with large corrals across the road.  The station served as a Pony Express stop up until October 26, 1861. Upon completion of the wagon road over Kingsbury Grade, the Pony Express route continued from Mormon (Genoa) Station to Friday's Station and then along the south shore of Lake Tahoe stopping at Yank's Station Toll House, near Myers (original spelling) on U.S. 50. It then continued on to Strawberry Station. Warren Upson was the first Pony Express rider to arrive here on April 28, 1860. The station also served as a stage stop with a trading post and hotel. The toll house was pushed off its foundation by flood waters and is currently located on blocks adjacent to the Tahoe Paradise Museum. In 1873 George Henry Dudley Meyers bought the property. Business flourished at the newly rebuilt station for decades; it continued to serve as a hotel and store until November 25, 1938, when the building was destroyed by fire during the Meyers town fire. A post office opened in 1904 south of the station. The post office closed in 1957, and reopened in 1958. It was adjacent to the Lincoln Highway Sierra Nevada Southern Route by 1916. It was renamed Tahoe Paradise in 1962.  Since then, houses have been built sporadically in the meandering neighborhoods that surround it. A USGS topographic map from 1891 shows Yanks near present day Camp Richarson and Meyers as its own distinct locale. By 1896, a railroad had been connected that ran up Lake Valley from a landing in Bijou.

On June 10, 1991, Jaycee Lee Dugard was kidnapped in Meyers. She was confined for 18 years in Antioch, California, and was found alive in 2009 in Berkeley.

Amenities 
Meyers has one grocery store, Holiday Market, a hardware shop and lumber yard, Meeks, and multiple other restaurants and shops. There is a California Highway Patrol station near the south end, along with an insect inspection station and a post office.

Climbing 
Meyers is located 20 minutes from Lovers Leap campground and climbing area. Meyers also has its own local climbing areas, including the Pie Shop on Sawmill Road. Pie Shop houses a bouldering area right off the road and a sport and trad climbing area up a short hike.

Notes

Unincorporated communities in California
Unincorporated communities in El Dorado County, California
Unincorporated communities in the Sacramento metropolitan area
California Historical Landmarks
South Lake Tahoe, California
Pony Express stations
Lincoln Highway
Populated places established in 1851